Glaucocharis stella is a species of moth in the family Crambidae. It is endemic to New Zealand.

Taxonomy 
This species was described by Edward Meyrick in 1938 using the name Glaucocharis stella.

Description 
This species was described by Meyrick as follows:

Distribution 
This species is endemic to New Zealand.

References

Diptychophorini
Moths described in 1938
Moths of New Zealand
Endemic fauna of New Zealand
Taxa named by Edward Meyrick
Endemic moths of New Zealand